The Queen (simplified Chinese: 复仇女王) is a Singaporean television thriller action crime fatal produced by Wawa Pictures in 2016, starring Jesseca Liu, Priscelia Chan, Vivian Lai, Apple Hong and Jayley Woo as the main characters of the series. Members from an exclusive invite-only ‘Revenge Queen’ club are regular white and blue collar workers by day, but by night, they put on black masquerade masks, avenge fellow womenfolk in trouble and help them stand up on their feet again. The series began airing on Channel 8 HD on Thursday, 18 February 2016 with 20 episodes.

Episodes

See also
The Queen
List of MediaCorp Channel 8 Chinese Drama Series (2010s)

Lists of Singaporean television series episodes